Douglas Hamilton Johnson is an American scholar who lives in Britain who specializes in the history of North East Africa, Sudan and the Southern Sudan.

Work in the Sudan
Johnson worked to support the 2003 Sudan Comprehensive Peace Agreement negotiations over the Three Areas (Abyei, Nuba Mountains and Blue Nile). In 2005 he was a member of the Abyei Boundary Commission, chaired by Donald K. Petterson, with the task of settling the borders of Abyei, a district disputed between the Sudan and the newly self-governing South Sudan, and was one of the five independent experts tasked with presenting the Commission's final report.

Since then, he has advised the Government of South Sudan on North-South boundary issues.

Personal life
In 1977, Johnson married Wendy James, a British anthropologist and academic. Together, they have had two children: one son and one daughter.

Selected publications 
 South Sudan: A New History for a New Nation, Ohio University Press (Ohio Short Histories of Africa series), 2016, 
 “Decolonizing the Borders in Sudan: Ethnic Territories and National Development”, in Empire, Development and Colonialism: The Past in the Present, (Mark Duffield & Vernon Hewitt, eds), Woodbrige & Rochester NY: James Currey, 2009, 
 “Tribe or Nationality?  The Sudanese Diaspora and the Kenyan Nubis”, Journal of Eastern African Studies, Volume 3, Number 1, pp. 112–31, 2009
 “Political Intelligence, Colonial Ethnography and Analytical Anthropology in the Sudan”, Ordering Africa: Anthropology, European Imperialism and the Politics of Knowledge (Helen Tilley & Robert Gordon, eds), Manchester: Manchester University Press, 2007 
 “Darfur: Peace, Genocide and Crimes against Humanity in Sudan”, in Violence, Political Culture & Development in Africa (Preben Kaarsholm, ed), Oxford: James Currey, 2006, 
 The Root Causes of Sudan's Civil Wars, James Currey: Oxford, 2003, 
 Editor, "Series B, Volume 5 (Sudan)" in British Documents on the End of Empire, 1998
Part I 1942-1950  
Part II 1951-1956,  
 "The Sudan People’s Liberation Army and the Problem of Factionalism" in African Guerrillas (Christopher Clapham, ed). Oxford: James Currey, 1998, 
 Joanna Macrae, Mark Bradbury, Susanne Jaspars, Douglas Johnson & Mark Duffield, "Conflict, the Continuum and Chronic Emergencies: A Critical Analysis of the Scope for Linking Relief, Rehabilitation and Development Planning in Sudan" in Disasters, Volume 21 Issue 3, Pages 223 - 243, September 1997
 Karim, Ataul, Mark Duffield, Susanne Jaspars, Aldo Benini, Joanna Macrae, Mark Bradbury, Douglas Johnson & George Larbi. Operation Lifeline Sudan (OLS): a review (Geneva: Department of Humanitarian Affairs, 1996)
 Wendy James, Gerd Baumann & Douglas Johnson, eds, Juan Maria Schuver's Travels in North East Africa, 1880-1883, London: The Hakluyt Society, 1996, 
 Editor, C.A. Willis, The Upper Nile Province Handbook: A Report on Peoples and Government in the Southern Sudan, 1931, Oriental and African Archives 3, Oxford: Oxford University Press for the British Academy, 1995, 
 David M. Anderson & Douglas H. Johnson, eds, Revealing Prophets: Prophecy in Eastern African History, London: James Currey, 1995, 
 Nuer Prophets: A History of Prophecy from the Upper Nile in the Nineteenth and Twentieth Centuries, Oxford: Clarendon Press, 1994, 
 Editor, Governing the Nuer: Documents by Percy Coriat on Nuer History and Ethnography, 1922-1931, Oxford: JASO, 1993, 
 "Salim Wilson: The Black Evangelist of the North", Journal of Religion in Africa, Volume 21, Number 1, pp. 26–41, 1991
"Criminal Secrecy: The Case of the Zande 'Secret Societies'" in Past & Present, Volume 130, Number 1, pp. 170–200, 1991
 “Political Ecology in the Upper Nile: The Twentieth Century Expansion of the Pastoral ‘Common Economy’”, Journal of African History, Volume 30, Number 3, pp. 463-86, 1989
 Douglas H. Johnson & David M. Anderson, eds, The Ecology of Survival: Case Studies from Northeast African History, London: Lester Crook Academic Publishing, 1988, 
 Wendy James & Douglas H. Johnson, eds, Vernacular Christianity: Essays in the Social Anthropology of Religion, Oxford: JASO, 1988, 
 "Sudanese Military Slavery from the Eighteenth to the Twentieth Century" in Slavery and Other Forms of Unfree Labour (Léonie J. Archer, ed), London: Routledge, 1988 
 “On the Nilotic Frontier: Imperial Ethiopia in the Southern Sudan, 1898-1936”, in The Southern Marches of Imperial Ethiopia: Essays in History and Social Anthropology (D. Donham & Wendy James, eds),  Cambridge: Cambridge University Press, 1986 (paperback Oxford: James Currey, 2002 )
 “The Death of Gordon: a Victorian Myth”, Journal of Imperial and Commonwealth History, Volume 10, Number 2, pp. 285–310, 1982
 “Tribal Boundaries and Border Wars: Nuer-Dinka Relations in the Sobat and Zaraf Valleys, c. 1860-1976”, Journal of African History, Volume 23, Number 2, pp. 183–203, 1982
 "Evans-Pritchard, The Nuer, and the Sudan Political Service" in African Affairs, Volume 81, Number 323, pp. 231–246, 1982
 "History and Prophecy among the Nuer of the Southern Sudan", PhD thesis, UCLA, University Microfilms International, Ann Arbor, Mich., 1980

References

External links 
 "SUDAN: Interview with Douglas Johnson, expert on the Abyei Boundary Commission", IRIN, 29 May 2006
 "Douglas Johnson - Sudan's Civil Wars", hosted by Google Video, distributed by understandingsudan.org, 2006

Living people
Year of birth missing (living people)
British historians
Historians of Africa